Bilaspur is a village in Umaria district, Madhya Pradesh, India. Bilaspur is covered under Anuppur Assembly constituency at state level and Shahdol parliamentary constituency at national level.
Bilaspur village is a gram panchayat as per the 2011 Census of India. The village has 250 houses with a population of 1,118 members consisting of 561 males and 557 females. Male literacy is 57.4% and female literacy is 40.04%  making an average of 48.75%. Bilaspur is headed by a sarpanch who is elected through local elections.

Geography 

Economy 

Transportation 

See also 
Dindori

References

External links 
Official Website

Villages in Umaria district